Carsten Peterson, born in 1945 and married to journalist Lotten Peterson, is a Swedish theoretical physicist and professor at Lund University. His current field of research is computational biology.

After finishing his PhD studies in theoretical physics at Lund University in 1977, Peterson worked as a postdoctoral researcher at NORDITA in Copenhagen in 1978-1979 and at Stanford University in 1980-1982 before returning to Lund. He has since then been active there, except for a sabbatical period in 1986-1988 when he hold a Senior Scientist position at Microelectronics and Computer Technology Corporation in Austin, Texas.
Peterson is a professor in theoretical physics and was elected to the Royal Swedish Academy of Sciences in 2006.

Peterson's field of research was originally theoretical particle physics and statistical mechanics. In the late 1980s he switched interests into machine learning methods for pattern recognition and image processing as well as algorithms for difficult optimization problems. In particular he mapped the latter onto spin systems within physics  – a field that is now gaining attention when it comes to quantum computers. With regard to pattern recognition, he early on contributed with a learning algorithm for neural networks, the mean field method, which was relevant for the first steps in developing the current fashion “Deep Learning”. His group in Lund were somewhat of pioneers when it came to clinical predictors using machine learning. Since the early 1990s he has mostly been active within the interface between physics and biology with focus on biomarkers for serious diseases as well as gene regulation – the latter often with a network perspective approached with mechanistic methods. His currently focused on how and when stem cells commit to become mature cells. 
Peterson is keen on whenever possible confronting his computational results with reality and his activities is often integrated with experimental groups.
but in the late 1980s he turned to pattern recognition and optimization, and from there to the intersection of physics and biology.

As his interests increasingly went beyond more conventional physics, he pioneered the formation of a Complex Systems division in 1989, which later evolved into Computational Biology (2000).

References

1945 births
Living people
Swedish physicists
Academic staff of Lund University